Afro-Disiac is an album by organist Charles Kynard which was recorded in 1970 and released on the Prestige label.

Reception 

Richie Unterberger of Allmusic said, "On this 1970 session, Kynard was backed by a first-rate quartet of musicians that often appeared on Prestige soul-jazz dates of the early 1970s... Kynard's one of the more understated soul-jazz organists of the era, and shares space pretty generously with the other musicians on these basic, funky vamps".

Track listing 
All compositions by Richard Fritz except where noted.
 "Afro-Disiac" – 4:52
 "Bella Donna" – 5:03
 "Trippin'" (Charles Kynard) – 9:00
 "Odds On" – 7:07
 "Sweetheart" (Winfield Scott) – 7:52
 "Chanson Du Nuit" – 5:00

Personnel 
Charles Kynard – organ
Houston Person – tenor saxophone
Grant Green – guitar
Jimmy Lewis – electric bass
Bernard Purdie – drums
Richard Fritz – arranger (tracks 1, 2, 4 & 6)

References 

Charles Kynard albums
1970 albums
Prestige Records albums
Albums produced by Bob Porter (record producer)
Albums recorded at Van Gelder Studio